John Taft may refer to:
 John Taft (ice hockey), American ice hockey player
 John B. Taft, American farmer and politician
 John G. Taft, American financier and writer
 John Taft (basketball), American basketball player